Sylvia Tiryaki is a scholar, lawyer specialized in the fields of Human Rights and International Public Law and European Law, active member of civil society, and current Chairwoman of the Helsinki Committee for Human Rights in Slovakia.

Academic and Professional Life 
Between 2003 and 2018, she worked as a faculty member and assistant professor at the Department of International Relations, Faculty of Economics and Administrative Sciences at the Istanbul Kültür University, where she later held the position of Vice-chair of the department. Currently, she is a university fellow lecturer at the Bratislava International School of Liberal Arts (BISLA) where she gives lectures on Human Rights, International Public Law, and Current Issues in the Middle East.

As Chairwoman of the Helsinki Committee for Human Rights in Slovakia, professor Tiryaki promotes security and education about human rights. With a specialization on the Middle East and Turkey, she was an advisor for the Slovak Minister for Foreign Affairs. Currently, she works as a fellow associate for the Middle East at GLOBSEC. Currently, she is an assistant professor at the  Pan-European University, the institute of international and European law. Simultaneously, she lectures at the Bratislava International School of Liberal Arts (BISLA) on Human Rights, International Public Law, and Current Issues in the Middle East. 

During her academic and professional career in Turkey, she held the position of Vice-chair of the International Department of Istanbul Kültür University. She worked as a senior research fellow and project coordinator for the leading Turkish think tank (founded in 1994), Turkish Economic and Social Studies Foundation (TESEV) between 2003 and 2008. Her work for the organization contributed to the final version of the Annan Plan for reunification of Cyprus. Later, she moved from TESEV to Global Political Trends Center (GPoT Center) in Istanbul, which she co-founded with her colleague Mensur Akgün in 2008, and served as deputy director until 2018. She works there as an associate fellow until this day. Between 2006 and 2009, she was a regular columnist for the Turkish Daily News (Hürriyet Daily News).

In addition, Sylvia Tiryaki is also a former member of the board of Human Security Collective. She also helped to found World Disability Foundation.

Between 2003 and 2008, she was a senior research fellow and coordinated a series of Cyprus projects at the Turkish Economic and Social Studies Foundation (TESEV), Foreign Policy Program.

Education 
Sylvia Tiryaki obtained her Master’s Degree in law and her Doctorate in European law at the Law Faculty of Comenius University in Bratislava. She later acquired a PhD in European studies and political theory.

Publications
 Finding Common Grounds - Rediscovering the Common Narrative of Turkey and Europe. Bratislava: RC SFPA, 2009. (Edited book)
 A Promise to Keep: Time to end the international isolation of the Turkish Cypriots. Istanbul: TESEV Publications, June 2008. (Edited book)
 EU Accession Prospects for Turkey and Ukraine: Debates in New Member States. Warsaw: Institute of Public Affairs, 2006. (Edited book)
 Quo Vadis Cyprus?. Istanbul: TESEV Publications, April 2005. (Edited book)
 Freedom Flotila: Before and Aftermath in Middle East Observer. Anhens: Security and Defence Analysis Institute, Vol. 1, issue 3, August 2010.
 Ending the Isolation of Turkish Cypriots in Insight Turkey. Istanbul: SETA Foundation, Vol. 12, No. 1/2010, February 2010.
 European Identity 2006 in International Issues & Slovak Foreign Policy Affairs. Bratislava: RC SFPA, Vol. 1, 2006.
 The Annan Plan: A Missed Opportunity. World Security Network, 14 May 2004.

References

External links
 Sylvia Tiryaki - official website
 Global Political Trends Center
 Istanbul Kültür University

Slovak activists
Slovak women activists
Living people
Year of birth missing (living people)